Modica Way (officially "Richard B. Modica Way") aka "Graffiti Alley" is a legal graffiti gallery in Central Square, Cambridge, Massachusetts. It was begun in 2006 and has been described as "the hallmark of Central Square"   and "one of Boston's most instagrammable spots."

References

Graffiti in the United States